Dorasque, which has the dialects Chumulu, Changuena (Changuina), and Gualaca, is an extinct Chibchan language of Panama.

References

 Alphonse Louis Pinart, Vocabulario Castellano-dorasque, Dialectos Chumulu, Gualaca y Changuina, 1890

Languages of Panama
Chibchan languages